Jerry Kang (born 1968) is a South Korean-born American legal scholar and academic administrator. He is a Professor of Law at the UCLA School of Law, where he also taught Asian American Studies. Since 2015, he has served as is UCLA's first vice chancellor for equity, diversity, and inclusion.

Early life
Kang was born in South Korea. He graduated from Harvard University, where he earned a bachelor of arts in 1990. He went on to earn a juris doctor from the Harvard Law School in 1993. He was a supervising editor of the Harvard Law Review, and he also served as Special Assistant to Harvard University's Advisory Committee on Free Speech.

Career
Kang was appointed as UCLA's  first vice chancellor for equity, diversity and inclusion on July 1, 2015. 
Kang joined the UCLA School of Law in 1995. He teaches the law and Asian American Studies. He has published research about the Internment of Japanese Americans during World War II.

In October 2016, leaflets published by the David Horowitz Freedom Center suggested Kang was an "advocate of campus terrorist supporters" for his support of Students for Justice in Palestine. In a similar style, in October 2017, fliers appeared on the UCLA campus naming Kang as the "Minister of Inequity, Homogeneity, and Exclusion," alleging that his leadership "opposes intellectual diversity, stifles freedom of speech, and promotes dictatorial demagoguery." Both the 2016 and 2017 events included the hashtag #NoSanctuaryCampusForCriminals.

Kang earned $354,900 in 2015 and $444,234.00 in 2016.

On October 29, 2021, President Joe Biden nominated Kang to be a member of the National Council on the Humanities within the National Endowment for the Humanities.

References

Living people
1968 births
South Korean emigrants to the United States
Harvard Law School alumni
UCLA School of Law faculty
American legal scholars